Trinidad station is a train station in Trinidad, Colorado served by Amtrak. It is served by Amtrak's Southwest Chief line. Trinidad station was originally built by the Atchison, Topeka and Santa Fe Railway, however it was not built in the Spanish Mission style, as many former Santa Fe Railroad stations were.

In the late 2000s, the South Central Council of Governments (South Central COG), which operates a local bus service, decided to pursue funding for a new multimodal transportation center to serve intercity passenger rail and local, regional, and intercity buses. Owned by the city but operated and maintained by the South Central COG, it would contain a waiting area with seating, restrooms, and ticket booths.

See also 
List of Amtrak stations

References

External links

Trinidad Amtrak Station (USA Rail Guide -- TrainWeb)

Amtrak stations in Colorado
Atchison, Topeka and Santa Fe Railway stations
Transportation buildings and structures in Las Animas County, Colorado